Operation Blue Jay was the code name for the construction of Thule Air Base in Greenland. It started as a secret project, but was made public in September 1952.

Documentary

Operation Blue Jay is a 1953 American short documentary film about the project. Master Sergeant Lester A. Marks was the sole cinematographer for this film when he worked for the US Signal Corps. It aired on television on the series The Big Picture.

The film was nominated for an Academy Award for Best Documentary Short.

References

External links

Operation Blue Jay at the National Archives and Records Administration

1953 films
American black-and-white films
American short documentary films
Black-and-white documentary films
1950s short documentary films
Documentary films about the Arctic
Films set in Greenland
Films shot in Greenland
1953 documentary films
1950s English-language films
1950s American films